Lily Chodidjah Wahid (4 March 1948 – 9 May 2022) was an Indonesian politician. A member of the National Awakening Party, she served in the People's Representative Council from 2009 to 2013. She died in Jakarta on 9 May 2022 at the age of 74.

References

1948 births
2022 deaths
Members of the People's Representative Council, 2009
National Awakening Party politicians
People's Conscience Party politicians
Javanese people
People from Jombang Regency